The Poor Millionaire (Swedish: En fattig miljonär) is a 1941 Swedish comedy film directed by Lennart Wallén and Sigurd Wallén and starring Stig Järrel, Dagmar Ebbesen and Marianne Aminoff. The film's sets were designed by the art director Bibi Lindström.

Cast
 Stig Järrel as Nils Holm
 Sigurd Wallén as John Lundgren
 Dagmar Ebbesen as 	Anna Svensson
 Marianne Aminoff as 	Gittan Svensson
 Marianne Löfgren as 	Karin Jönsson
 Geraldine Hislop as 	Vera Wigo
 Hilding Gavle as 	Lindgren
 Magnus Kesster as 	Manager
 Arne Lindblad as 	Jansson
 Bellan Roos as 	Old Gossip
 Artur Rolén as 	Photographer
 Wiktor Andersson as 	Man in cafe 
 Julia Cæsar as Woman in coffee shop
 Betty Bjurström as Coffee shop girl

References

Bibliography 
 Krawc, Alfred. International Directory of Cinematographers, Set- and Costume Designers in Film: Denmark, Finland, Norway, Sweden (from the beginnings to 1984). Saur, 1986.
 Qvist, Per Olov & von Bagh, Peter. Guide to the Cinema of Sweden and Finland. Greenwood Publishing Group, 2000.
 Wredlund, Bertil. Långfilm i Sverige: 1940-1949. Proprius, 1981.

External links 
 

1941 films
Swedish comedy films
1941 comedy films
1940s Swedish-language films
Films directed by Sigurd Wallén
Swedish black-and-white films
1940s Swedish films